Micah McFadden (born January 3, 2000) is an American football linebacker for the New York Giants of the National Football League (NFL). He played college football at Indiana.

High school career
McFadden played at Plant High School in Tampa, Florida under head coach Robert Weiner. As a senior in high school, McFadden was named first-team all-state. He was a three-star recruit.

College career
McFadden played for the Indiana Hoosiers as a linebacker. As a freshman, he played 12 games and had 20 tackles and a forced fumble. As a sophomore, his role increased and had a combined 61 tackles, two interceptions and a forced fumble. McFadden was named IU’s Most Outstanding Defensive Player of the Year. As a junior, he led the team in tackles with 58, had six sacks and grabbed two interceptions. McFadden was honored as Indiana’s Anthony Thompson Most Valuable Player. As a senior he had 77 tackles, 6.5 sacks, two forced fumbles and one fumble recovery.

Professional career

McFadden was drafted by the New York Giants with the 146th pick in the fifth round of the 2022 NFL Draft. In Week 8 against the Seattle Seahawks, McFadden recorded his first career sack against quarterback Geno Smith in a 27-13 loss.

References

External links
 New York Giants bio
 Indiana Hoosiers bio

2000 births
Living people
Players of American football from Tampa, Florida
American football linebackers
Indiana Hoosiers football players
New York Giants players
Henry B. Plant High School alumni